The 31 March Incident (or ) was a political crisis within the Ottoman Empire in April 1909, during the Second Constitutional Era. Occurring soon after the 1908 Young Turk Revolution, in which the Committee of Union and Progress (CUP) had successfully restored the Constitution and ended the absolute rule of Sultan Abdul Hamid II, it is sometimes referred to as an attempted countercoup or counterrevolution. It consisted of a general uprising against the CUP within Istanbul, largely led by reactionary groups, particularly Islamists opposed to the secularising influence of the CUP and supporters of absolutism, although liberal opponents of the CUP within the Ottoman Liberty Party also played a lesser role. The crisis ended after eleven days, when troops loyal to the CUP restored order in Istanbul and deposed Abdul Hamid.

The crisis began with a mutiny among elite Macedonian troops of the Istanbul garrison on the night of 12–13 April (R.C. 30–31 March) 1909, sparked by agitation from Muslim fundamentalists, low morale and officerial mismanagement. The unrest spiralled out of control as religious students and other elements of the city's garrison joined the insurrection, converging on Ayasofya Square to demand the re-establishment of Sharia. The CUP-aligned government of Grand Vizier Hüseyin Hilmi Pasha responded ineffectually, and by the afternoon of 13 April its authority in the capital had collapsed. The Sultan accepted Hilmi Pasha's resignation and appointed a new cabinet free from the CUP's influence under Ahmet Tevfik Pasha. Most CUP members fled the city for their power base in Salonika (modern Thessaloniki), while Mehmed Talaat escaped with 100 deputies to San Stefano (Yeşilköy), where they proclaimed the new ministry illegal and attempted to rally secularists and minorities in support of their cause. For a brief period the two rival authorities in Istanbul and Aya Stehano each claimed to represent the legitimate government. These events triggered the Adana massacre, a month-long series of anti-Armenian pogroms organised by local officials and Islamic clerics in which 20,000 to 25,000 Armenians, Greeks and Assyrians were killed.

The uprising was suppressed and the former government restored when elements of the Ottoman Army sympathetic to the CUP formed an impromptu military force known as the Action Army, which entered Istanbul on 24 April after failed negotiations. On 27 April, Abdul Hamid II, accused by the CUP of complicity in the uprising, was deposed by the National Assembly and his brother, Mehmed V, made sultan. Mahmud Shevket Pasha, the military general who had organised and led the Action Army, became the most influential figure in the restored constitutional system until his assassination in 1913.

The precise nature of events is uncertain; differing interpretations have been offered by historians, ranging from a spontaneous revolt of discontents to a secretly planned and coordinated counter-revolution against the CUP. Most modern studies disregard claims the Sultan was actively involved in plotting the uprising, emphasising the CUP's mismanagement of troops in the build up to the mutiny and the role of conservative religious groups. The crisis was an important early moment in the empire's process of disintegration, setting a pattern of political instability which continued with military coups in 1912 and 1913. The temporary loss of power led to radicalisation within the CUP, resulting in an increasing willingness among unionists to utilise violence. Some scholars have argued that the deterioration of ethnic relations and erosion of public institutions during 1908–1909 precipitated the Armenian genocide.

Background 

The educational reforms during Abdul Hamid II's reign (1876–1909) had led to an increased diffusion of liberal political thought from Western Europe among young Ottoman professionals and military officers. A loosely organised underground movement of reformists known as the Young Turks emerged to press for the restoration of a constitutional monarchy and political reform. These demands were partly inspired by the Young Ottomans, a secret society of intellectuals which had forced Abdul Hamid to enact a liberal constitution during the brief First Constitutional Era (1876–1878).

In July 1908, a secret revolutionary organisation called the Committee of Union and Progress (CUP) led an insurrection in the empire's Balkan provinces which compelled the sultan to restore the constitution of 1876, in what became known as the Young Turk Revolution. The CUP, internally divided and lacking an agreed political program, did not take over government; instead it chose to influence the unsteady parliamentary regime from a distance and its Central Committee remained based in Salonika. The CUP cautiously undertook to restrict the sultan's powers and by early August 1908 it had overseen the transfer of navy and army ministerial appointments away from the sultan to the office of the grand vizier. The sultan's palace staff were reduced and replaced with CUP members who monitored Abdul Hamid's official correspondence. Meanwhile, the interim government of Kâmil Pasha carried out a series of democratic and administrative reforms, abolishing the secret police and rescinding press censorship powers, permitting free political campaigning ahead of a general election held during November and December. Abdul Hamid opened the new parliamentary session on 17 December.

Throughout 1908, as events continued to unfold in Istanbul, the Ottoman Empire lost large portions of its European territory. This was due to both encroachments by foreign powers and the activity of the empire's ethnic minorities: Austria annexed Bosnia-Herzegovina, Bulgaria declared independence, and Greece seized Crete. These losses dampened the popular elation that had followed the re-establishment of parliament, while open political debate brought existing cleavages to the surface. Muslims saw the new government as impotent in the face of pressure from European powers, while government promises to reclaim the lost territories upset minorities who hoped for greater autonomy or independence. One of the greatest threats came from supporters of Islamism, who agitated against the secular nature of the new constitution and equality for non-Muslims, arguing that the adoption of Western technology did not need to be accompanied by a move away from Islamic law. This view was widely held throughout Ottoman society and Islamists may have enjoyed the private support of Abdul Hamid, despite his proclamations in favour of the new constitution.

Military revolt

Prelude

In October 1908, the Committee of Union and Progress arranged for the transfer of three seasoned sharpshooter battalions of the Third Army Corps from Salonika to Istanbul in response to increased political tension in the city and concerns over the loyalty of its regular garrison, the First Army Corps. The Third Army's  officers – graduates of the prestigious Ottoman Military College trained in modern military techniques – had played an instrumental role in the 1908 revolution. Upon their arrival in Istanbul, the well-connected  officers began to play an important role within the capital's political and social scene, attending CUP political functions, banquets and theatrical performances. With their officers increasingly absent, discipline within the sharpshooter battalions began to break down. A generational divide exacerbated the poor relationship between the officers and their men, as opponents of the CUP within the military expressed unhappiness with entrusting the empire's leadership to "yesterday’s school children", the young CUP officers recently graduated from military academies, at the expense of more experienced officers who had climbed the ranks. The situation worsened when the newly elected parliament announced its intention to retire a significant part of the officer corps, with cuts disproportionately affecting non-commissioned officers.

In late October, authorities arranged for the transfer of Albanian troops seen as hostile to the new regime out of Istanbul. Many of these soldiers were soon due to be discharged, and upon receiving orders for deployment to Yemen a portion refused and demonstrated for the immediate termination of their contracts. Troops from the fourth  battalion were sent to suppress the protests by force and a second riot among Albanian troops in March was again put down by  troops, who fired into the riotous crowd of Albanians with machine guns. These events severely damaged morale among the sharpshooters. In February 1909, Grand Vizier Kâmil Pasha moved to weaken the CUP's grip on power by appointing his own candidates as Ministers of War and Navy. In response, the CUP orchestrated a confidence vote against his cabinet, forcing him to resign. On 14 February 1909, the CUP's preferred candidate, Hüseyin Hilmi Pasha, was appointed the new grand vizier. Rumours spread within the city that the CUP would use the  troops to depose Abdul Hamid, or that Kâmil Pasha had attempted to order them back to Macedonia. As a consequence of these machinations, the battalions became increasingly politicised and, to the frustration of ordinary soldiers, seen as a tool of the CUP.

Discontent among the soldiers was further stirred up by Muslim fundamentalists. Islamists in Istanbul were led by a charismatic mystic from Cyprus called Hafiz Derviş Vahdeti, who may have belonged to the Bektashi Order. Religious conservatives portrayed the restored 1876 constitution as sacrificing Islamic traditions in order to curry favour with Western states and attacked the new general assembly for giving minorities and Christians within the empire greater influence, issues which resonated with soldiers who had recently been fighting separatists in the Balkans. Attempts by the CUP to introduce new  officers and training regimen into the First Army Corps resulted in less time for soldiers to undertake ablution and prayer, allowing Islamists to present the CUP and its officers as irreligious, even atheistic, free masons from Macedonia. Although Abdul Hamid refused to provide financial support for the movement and newspaper, figures connected with the palace purportedly supported Vahdeti and one of the sultan's sons, Şehzade Mehmed Burhaneddin, was a member of the Mohammedan Union. The society held its first mass rally on 3 April at the Hagia Sophia; its agitation for the restoration of Sharia gained widespread support, including from soldiers stationed in the city.

On 6 April, Hasan Fehmi, a prominent opposition journalist, was shot and killed as he crossed Galata Bridge in Istanbul. The assassination went unsolved but many in the city speculated that the CUP had been responsible. Protests by Islamic conservatives and seminary students over the killings led to unrest among soldiers in the city's main barracks.

Mutiny

Early on the morning of 13 April, troops of the fourth  regiment based at the Tashkishla barracks mutinied, locking up their officers and marching onto the streets to call for the reinstatement of Sharia and for the CUP to be disbanded. Religious students joined the mutinying soldiers outside the Sultan Ahmed Mosque, before marching to the Parliament building. Hilmi Pasha's government was in a state of confusion, and fearful of the repercussions of ordering remaining loyal troops against the protestors, it sent the Chief of Police instead to hear the crowd's requests. Six demands were prepared by the spokesmen of the mutineering soldiers: the return of Sharia law, the banishment of some CUP parliamentarians from Constantinople, the replacement of Ahmed Rıza (the CUP President of the Chamber of Deputies), the replacement of some CUP officers and the removal of the Grand Vizier along with the Ministers of War and Navy. By the afternoon the government's authority in the capital had collapsed, and faced with this ultimatum Hilmi Pasha and his cabinet resigned. The Sultan swiftly appointed Ahmet Tevfik Pasha as grand vizier.

Marshal Ethem Pasha, the War Minister of the new cabinet went to see the troops at Meydanı, gave them praise and told them that their requests would be fulfilled. The victory was celebrated by the soldiers and religious students. During the revolt, the CUP was targeted in a pogrom with protestors killing 20 people, mainly army officers, and two parliamentarians mistaken for Ahmet Rıza and Hüseyin Cahit (Yalçin), the editor of the CUP newspaper Tanin. Protestors also burned a few CUP offices such as those belonging to Tanin.

Political crisis

CUP members either hid or fled Constantinople. As such the Chamber of Deputies with a CUP majority lacked the numbers for a parliamentary session. Ismail Qemali, a Liberal deputy managed to get some parliamentarians to attend, they accepted the requests of the troops and made an official announcement that the constitution and Sharia law would be kept. Uninvolved in the events of the initial countercoup, Qemali was briefly made President of the Ottoman National Assembly and led it to recognise a new government by Abdul Hamid II. Qemali wired his constituency in Vlorë telling them to acknowledge the new government and Albanians from his hometown backed him with some raiding the arms depot to support the sultan with weapons if the situation called for it. At the same time Albanian clubs telegraphed support for quelling the uprising while Prenk Bib Doda, leader of the Mirdita offered assistance from his tribe, and these sentiments where more due to fears that the Hamidian regime could return than loyalty toward the CUP. During the countercoup, Isa Boletini along with several Kosovo Albanian chieftains offered the sultan military assistance.

The Sultan in turn promised to bring about the rule of religion, were he to be returned to power. Dervish Vahdeti reigned supreme in Constantinople for 11 days.

After the CUP had been driven out of the capital, the Edirne deputy and CUP member Mehmed Talaat escaped with 100 deputies to Ayastefanos (Yeşilköy), and organized a counter government, declaring the new government in Constantinople illegal. Within Istanbul, the leadership of the Liberal Party unsuccessfully attempted to maintain control of events and stop the rebellion from developing on a reactionary pro-Hamidian, anti-constitutionalist course. Additionally, within the ranks of the Islamic clergy there was conflict between the higher-ranking ulama, united within the Society of the Islamic Scholarly Profession, and imams who gave support to the uprising. From 16 April onward the ulama publicly denounced the revolt.

The CUP retained its position among the provinces, particularly in Macedonia, and began to take immediate countermeasures. Public demonstrations were organised at towns in the provinces, while numerous telegrams were sent to the palace and parliament. The historian Erik-Jan Zürcher has commented that the CUP was largely successful in its propaganda, and was able to convince a significant portion of the population of Macedonia that the constitution was in peril.

Formation of the Action Army

From 15 April the CUP began preparations for a military operation against the rebels. It appealed to Mahmud Shevket Pasha, commander of the Ottoman Third Army based in Selanik (modern Thessaloniki) to quell the uprising. With support from the commander of the Ottoman Second Army in Edirne, Mahmud Shevket combined the armies to create a strike force called the "Action Army". The force numbered 20,000–25,000 regular troops, reinforced with volunteer units, mostly Albanians led by Major Ahmed Niyazi Bey. The eleventh Reserve (Redif) Division based in Selanik composed the advance guard of the Action Army and the chief of staff was Mustafa Kemal Pasha.

In short time CUP members Fethi Okyar, Hafız Hakkı and Enver Bey returned from their international posts at Ottoman embassies and joined Mahmud Shevket and his military staff prior to reaching Istanbul. The Action Army's troops were transported by train to Çatalca and Hademköy, and then to Ayastefanos (also referred to as San Stefano; modern Yeşilköy). It was secretly agreed there that Abdulhamid would be deposed for his brother Reşad. A delegation was sent to Army headquarters by the Ottoman parliament that sought to stop it from taking Istanbul through force. The response was negative and the delegation then went to Ayastefanos and made a call for colleagues to unite with them. Both parliamentary chambers convened as a National Assembly (meclis-i umumi-i milli) at the Yachting Club building of Ayastefanos on 23 April and thereafter. Qemali had left the city prior to the Action Army arriving at Constantinople and he fled to Greece.

The Sultan remained in the Yildiz and had frequent conferences with Grand Vizier Tewfik Pasha who announced:  Negotiations continued for six days. The negotiators were Rear Admiral Arif Hikmet Pasha, Emanuel Karasu Efendi (Carasso), Esad Pasha Toptani, Aram Efendi and Colonel Galip Bey (Pasiner). Finally, at the moment when the conflict showed signs of extending to the public, the Salonikan troops entered Istanbul.

Rebellion suppressed

Early on the morning of 24 April the Action Army began to occupy Istanbul, with the operation directed by Ali Pasha Kolonja. There was little meaningful resistance, with the exception of Tașkışla and Taksim barracks; by four o'clock of the afternoon the remaining rebels surrendered.

There was fierce street fighting in the European quarter where the guard houses were held by the First Army Corps. There was heavy fire from troops in the Tashkishla barracks against the advancing troops. The barracks had to be shelled and almost destroyed by the artillery located on the heights above the barracks before the garrison surrendered after several hours fighting and heavy losses. Equally desperate was the defence of the Taksim barracks. The attack on the Taksim barracks was led by Enver Bey. After a short battle they gained control of the palace on 27 April.

Under martial law and following the defeat of the rebellion two courts martial sentenced and executed the majority of the rebels which included Dervish Vahdeti. Albanians involved in the counterrevolutionary movement were executed such as Halil Bey from Krajë which caused indignation among conservative Muslims of Shkodër. Some Liberal (Ahrar) political leaders were arrested and British pressure resulted in their freedom. A government investigation later cleared Qemali of any wrongdoing. Sultan Abdul Hamid was deserted by most of his advisors. The parliament discussed the question as to whether he would be permitted to remain on the throne or be deposed or even be executed. Putting the Sultan to death was considered unwise as such a step might rouse a fanatical response and plunge the Empire into civil war. On the other hand, there were those who felt that after all that had happened it was impossible that the Parliament could ever again work with the Sultan.

On 27 April the Assembly held a meeting behind closed doors under the presidency of Said Pasha. In order to remove the Sultan, a fatwa was needed. So, a fatwa drawn up in the form of question and was given to scholars to answer and sign. A scholar by the name of Nuri Efendi was brought to sign the fatwa. Initially, Nuri Efendi was unsure whether three crimes raised in the question were carried out by Abdulhamid. He initially suggested that it would better to ask the Sultan to resign. It was insisted that Nuri Efendi sign the fatwa. However Nuri Efendi continued to refuse. Finally, Mustafa Asim Efendi convinced him and so the fatwa was signed by him and then it was signed by the newly appointed Sheikh ul Islam, Mehmed Ziyâeddin Efendi, legalising it. The fatwa complete with the answer was now read to the assembled members:  Then the Assembly unanimously voted that Sultan Abdul Hamid should be deposed.

Allegations of foreign support 

Some writers have accused the British, led by Sir Gerald Fitzmaurice (1865–1939), Chief Dragoman of the British Embassy, of being the hidden hand behind a reactionary religious uprising. The British government had already supported actions against constitutionalists in an attempt to mute the effect of increasing German sympathizers in the Ottoman Empire since the 1880s. Also, according to these sources, this countercoup was directed specifically against the CUP's Salonica (Thessaloniki) branch, which had outmatched the British-sympathizing Monastir (Bitola) Branch.

Outcome 

The counter-coup's failure brought the Committee of Union and Progress back into power enabling it to form a government.

The incident led to a change of Grand Vizier with Ahmed Tevfik Pasha assuming the position. Other consequences were restoration of constitution for a third time (after earlier attempts in 1876 and 1908). 
Both parliamentary chambers convened on 27 April and deposed Abdul Hamid II. He was replaced with his younger brother Reşat who took the name Mehmed V, to symbolically style him as the second conquer of Istanbul after Mehmed II. Four CUP members composed of one Armenian, one Jew and two Muslim Albanians went to inform the sultan of his dethronement, with Essad Pasha Toptani being the main messenger saying "the nation has deposed you". Some Muslims expressed dismay that non Muslims had informed the sultan of his deposition. As a result, the focus of the sultan's rage was toward Toptani whom Abdul Hamid II felt had betrayed him. The sultan referred to him as a "wicked man", given that the extended Toptani family had benefited from royal patronage in gaining privileges and key positions in the Ottoman government. Albanians involved in the counterrevolutionary movement were executed such as Halil Bey from Krajë which caused indignation among conservative Muslims of Shkodër.

After the 31 March Incident, the Committee of Union and Progress outlawed societies which supported ethnic minorities' interests within Ottoman society, including the Society of Arab Ottoman Brotherhood, and prohibited the publication of several journals and newspapers that featured radical Islamic rhetoric.

Under the multi-religious "balancing policies", the Committee of Union and Progress believed it could achieve an "Ottomanisation" (i.e. Ottoman nationalism rather than ethnic or religious nationalism) of all the subjects of the Empire. These measures were successful in stirring some nationalist sentiment among the non-Turkish populations, further cementing a national sensibility resistant to conservative Islam.

Memorial

The Monument of Liberty was erected 1911 in Şişli district of Istanbul as a memorial to the 74 soldiers killed in action during this event.

See also
 Young Turk Revolution
Turkish War of Independence
Kapp Putch

References

Citations

Bibliography

Further reading

 
 
 
 

Politics of the Ottoman Empire
Rebellions against the Ottoman Empire
Enver Pasha
1909 in the Ottoman Empire
Military coups in the Ottoman Empire